Tucker Poolman (born June 8, 1993) is an American professional ice hockey defenseman currently playing for the  Vancouver Canucks of the National Hockey League (NHL).

Playing career

Early career
Born in Iowa, Poolman grew up in East Grand Forks, Minnesota where he played for the local high school hockey team. After going undrafted in the NHL Entry Draft, Poolman tried out for three teams in the North American Hockey League and United States Hockey League before being accepted onto the Wichita Falls Wildcats. In 2012, he committed to play NCAA Division 1 hockey for the University of North Dakota, his fathers alma mater. After playing with the Wildcats for one year, he was drafted by the Omaha Lancers in the United States Hockey League. In his first season on the team, Poolman was named to the 2013–14 USHL First All-Star Team, and was presented with the Dave Tyler Junior Player of the Year Award, as the most outstanding American-born player in junior hockey.

Collegiate
Poolman played for the University of North Dakota in the National Collegiate Athletic Association (NCAA) for three seasons, leaving with a degree in economics by taking summer school classes. In his freshman season with the Fighting Hawks, Poolman was selected for the 2014-15 Academic All-Conference Team after earning a GPA of 3.0 or higher. He recorded his first collegiate goal on October 18 in a 3–1 win over Colorado College. He ended the 2014–15 season one power play goal away from tying North Dakota's single-season record for a freshman defenseman.

In his sophomore season, Poolman recorded a career high 24 points and 19 assists, which ranked fifth among NCHC defensemen. As a result, he was named to the NCAA Midwest Region All-Tournament Team. In his last year on the team, Poolman recorded a breakout season with a career high 30 points. He became the first defenseman from North Dakota to reach 30-points since 2010-11. During the week of March 6, he was named National Collegiate Hockey Conference (NCHC) Defenseman of the Week after recording a conference leading five points. At the conclusion of the season, Poolman was the recipient of multiple awards including AHCA/CCM All-America West First Team, All-NCHC First Team, and the inaugural NCHC Defensive Defenseman of the Year Award.

Professional
Poolman has drawn comparisons with Jets defenseman Dustin Byfuglien for his physical play, and ability to play both as a forward and as a defensemen. Having completed his junior season with the Fighting Hawks, Poolman ended his collegiate career in agreeing to a one-year, entry-level contract on March 31, 2017.  Poolman made his NHL debut for the Winnipeg Jets on October 9, 2017, in a 5-2 win against the Edmonton Oilers. He recorded his first career NHL goal on December 23, 2017, against the New York Islanders. He was reassigned to the Jets American Hockey League (AHL) affiliate, the Manitoba Moose, until January 24, 2018, when he was recalled to replace an injured Shawn Matthias.

As a free agent following four seasons within the Jets organization, Poolman was signed to a four-year, $10 million contract with the Vancouver Canucks on July 28, 2021.

Personal life
Poolman was born to parents Mark and LeAnne. His father Mark was a hockey trainer for the Dubuque Fighting Saints and the University of North Dakota. His younger brother Colton also played for the University of North Dakota's Fighting Hawks and is currently signed with the Calgary Flames. Poolman is a practising Christian and previously gathered with former teammates Mark Scheifele, Josh Morrissey, and Adam Lowry to pray and talk.

Career statistics

Awards and honours

References

External links

1993 births
Living people
American men's ice hockey defensemen
Ice hockey people from Iowa
Ice hockey people from North Dakota
Manitoba Moose players
North Dakota Fighting Hawks men's ice hockey players
Omaha Lancers players
Vancouver Canucks players
Wichita Falls Wildcats players
Winnipeg Jets draft picks
Winnipeg Jets players
AHCA Division I men's ice hockey All-Americans